This is a list of 194 species in Corthylus, a genus of typical bark beetles in the family Curculionidae.

Corthylus species

 Corthylus abbreviatus Eichhoff, 1869a c
 Corthylus abruptedeclivis Schedl, 1966f c
 Corthylus additus Wood, 1974c c
 Corthylus affinis Fonseca, 1927 c
 Corthylus alienus Schedl, 1966f c
 Corthylus andinus Wood, 2007 c
 Corthylus annexus Wood, 2007 c
 Corthylus anomalus Bright, 1972a c
 Corthylus antennarius Schedl, 1966f c
 Corthylus araguensis Wood, 2007 c
 Corthylus argentinensis Schedl, 1950i c
 Corthylus ater Schedl, 1952d c
 Corthylus atomus Wood, 2007 c
 Corthylus attenuatus Wood, 2007 c
 Corthylus aztecus Bright, 1972a c
 Corthylus bellus Wood, 2007 c
 Corthylus bicolor Eggers, 1943a c
 Corthylus bifurcus Schedl, 1935h c
 Corthylus biseriatus Eggers, 1943d c
 Corthylus bituberculatus Nunberg, 1962 c
 Corthylus bolivianus Eggers, 1943a c
 Corthylus brunnescens Wood, 1981 c
 Corthylus brunneus Wood, 1974c c
 Corthylus calamarius Wood, 1974c c
 Corthylus callidus Schedl, 1973d c
 Corthylus calmicolens Wood, 1974c c
 Corthylus cannularius Wood, 1974c c
 Corthylus castaneus Ferrari, 1867a c
 Corthylus cavifrons Nunberg, 1962 c
 Corthylus cecropicolens Wood, 2007 c
 Corthylus cecropii Wood, 1975a c
 Corthylus chiriquensis Wood, 2007 c
 Corthylus cirrifer Wood, 2007 c
 Corthylus cirritus Wood, 1974c c
 Corthylus cirrus Schedl, 1940a c
 Corthylus coffeae Wood, 2007 c
 Corthylus collaris Blandford, 1904 c
 Corthylus columbianus Hopkins, 1894 i c b  (Columbian timber beetle)
 Corthylus comatus Blandford, 1904 c
 Corthylus comitabilis Wood, 2007 c
 Corthylus comosus Wood, 1974c c
 Corthylus compressicornis Erichson, 1836 c
 Corthylus concavus Bright, 1972a c
 Corthylus concisus Wood, 1974c c
 Corthylus confertus Wood, 2007 c
 Corthylus confusus Wood, 2007 c
 Corthylus consimilis Wood, 1974c c
 Corthylus convexicauda Eggers, 1931b c
 Corthylus convexifrons Wood, 1986c c
 Corthylus coronatus Eggers, 1933b c
 Corthylus costulatus Wood, 2007 c
 Corthylus crassus Wood, 2007 c
 Corthylus curiosus Bright, 1972d c
 Corthylus cylindricus Schedl, 1963c c
 Corthylus dentatus Eggers, 1943a c
 Corthylus detrimentosus Schedl, 1940a c
 Corthylus diligens Wood, 1974c c
 Corthylus dimidiatus Ferrari, 1867a c
 Corthylus discoideus Blandford, 1904 c
 Corthylus donaticus Wood, 1974c c
 Corthylus dubiosus Wood & Bright, 1992 c
 Corthylus eichhoffi Schedl, 1933b c
 Corthylus electinus Wood, 2007 c
 Corthylus emarginatus Eggers, 1943a c
 Corthylus epistomalis Wood, 2007 c
 Corthylus equihuai Wood, 2007 c
 Corthylus excisus Wood & Bright, 1992 c
 Corthylus exiguus Wood, 1984e c
 Corthylus fasciatus Erichson, 1836 c
 Corthylus flagellifer Blandford, 1904 c
 Corthylus frontalis Wood, 2007 c
 Corthylus fuscus Blandford, 1904 c
 Corthylus garai Wood, 2007 c
 Corthylus glabinus Bright, 1972a c
 Corthylus glabratus Ferrari, 1867a c
 Corthylus gracilens Wood, 2007 c
 Corthylus gracilior Wood, 2007 c
 Corthylus gracilis Wood & Bright, 1992 c
 Corthylus granulatus Schedl, 1935h c
 Corthylus granulifer Wood, 1974c c
 Corthylus guayanensis Eggers, 1933b c
 Corthylus ingaensis Wood & Bright, 1992 c
 Corthylus insignis Wood, 1974c c
 Corthylus insularis Bright & Torres, 2006 c
 Corthylus letzneri Wood & Bright, 1992 c
 Corthylus lobatus Ferrari, 1867a c
 Corthylus luridus Blandford, 1904 c
 Corthylus lustratus Wood, 1984e c
 Corthylus macrocerus Eichhoff, 1869a c
 Corthylus merkli Wood, 2007 c
 Corthylus mexicanus Schedl, 1950i c
 Corthylus micacirrus Wood, 1984e c
 Corthylus minimus Wood, 1974c c
 Corthylus minulus Wood, 2007 c
 Corthylus minutissimus Schedl, 1940a c
 Corthylus minutus Bright, 1972a c
 Corthylus mirabilis Nunberg, 1962 c
 Corthylus montanus Wood, 2007 c
 Corthylus nanus Wood, 1979b c
 Corthylus neotardus Wood & Bright, 1992 c
 Corthylus nevermanni Wood, 1982b c
 Corthylus niger Wood & Bright, 1992 c
 Corthylus nigrescens Wood, 2007 c
 Corthylus nigricans Wood, 2007 c
 Corthylus noguerai Wood, 2007 c
 Corthylus nolenae Wood, 1974c c
 Corthylus nudipennis Schedl, 1950i c
 Corthylus nudiusculus Schedl, 1950i c
 Corthylus nudus Schedl, 1940a c
 Corthylus obliquus Schedl, 1976a c
 Corthylus obtusus Schedl, 1966f c
 Corthylus oculatus Wood, 1974c c
 Corthylus oliveirai Schedl, 1976a c
 Corthylus panamensis Blandford, 1904 c
 Corthylus papuellus Wood, 2007 c
 Corthylus papulans Eichhoff, 1869a c
 Corthylus parvicirrus Wood, 2007 c
 Corthylus parvulus Blandford, 1904 c
 Corthylus peruanus Schedl, 1950i c
 Corthylus petilus Wood, 1967 i c
 Corthylus pharax Schedl, 1976a c
 Corthylus pilifer Wood, 2007 c
 Corthylus pinguis Wood, 2007 c
 Corthylus pisinnus Bright, 1972d c
 Corthylus plagiatus Eichhoff, 1869a c
 Corthylus praealtus Schedl, 1976a c
 Corthylus praeustus Schedl, 1950i c
 Corthylus procerus Bright, 1972a c
 Corthylus pseudoandinus Wood, 2007 c
 Corthylus pseudoexcisus Wood, 2007 c
 Corthylus pseudovillus Wood, 2007 c
 Corthylus ptyocerus Blandford, 1904 c
 Corthylus pumilus Wood, 1974c c
 Corthylus punctatissimus (Zimmermann, 1868) i c b  (pitted ambrosia beetle)
 Corthylus punctatus Eggers, 1943a c
 Corthylus punctifrons Wood, 2007 c
 Corthylus pusillus Eggers, 1943a c
 Corthylus pygmaeus Wood, 1974c c
 Corthylus reburrus Bright, 1972a c
 Corthylus redtenbacheri Ferrari, 1867a c
 Corthylus retusifer Wood, 1974c c
 Corthylus retusus Wood, 1974c c
 Corthylus robustus Schedl, 1936i c
 Corthylus rubricollis Blandford, 1904 c
 Corthylus rufopilosus Eggers, 1931b c
 Corthylus sanguineus Schedl, 1935h c
 Corthylus schaufussi Schedl, 1937g c
 Corthylus schulzi Wood, 2007 c
 Corthylus scutellaris LeConte, 1857 c
 Corthylus senticosus Wood, 1986c c
 Corthylus sentosus Wood, 1986c c
 Corthylus sentus Wood, 1974c c
 Corthylus serratus Wood, 1974c c
 Corthylus serrulatus Eggers, 1934a c
 Corthylus signatus Ferrari, 1867a c
 Corthylus simillimus Schedl, 1966f c
 Corthylus simplex Wood, 1974c c
 Corthylus simplicis Wood, 2007 c
 Corthylus sobrinus Wood, 1974c c
 Corthylus spinifer Schwarz, 1891 i c
 Corthylus spinipennis Wood, 2007 c
 Corthylus spinosus Wood, 1974c c
 Corthylus splendens Wood, 1967c c
 Corthylus splendidulus Wood, 2007 c
 Corthylus splendidus Bright, 1972a c
 Corthylus strigilatus Eggers, 1933b c
 Corthylus strigilis Wood, 1974c c
 Corthylus subasperatus Eggers, 1940 g
 Corthylus subasperulus Eggers, 1940a c
 Corthylus subserratus Wood, 1974c c
 Corthylus subsulcatus Schedl, 1961i c
 Corthylus suturalis Eggers, 1931b c
 Corthylus suturifer Schedl, 1963c c
 Corthylus tardulus Wood, 1981 c
 Corthylus theobromae Nunberg, 1971 c
 Corthylus tomentosus Schedl, 1940a c
 Corthylus transversus Eichhoff, 1869a c
 Corthylus trucis Wood, 1974c c
 Corthylus truncatiformus Wood, 2007 c
 Corthylus truncatus Wood, 1985 c
 Corthylus trunculus Wood, 1974c c
 Corthylus tuberculatus Eggers, 1940a c
 Corthylus tuberculifer Wood, 2007 c
 Corthylus tuberosus Wood, 2007 c
 Corthylus tulcanus Hagedorn, 1910b c
 Corthylus uniseptis Schedl, 1961i c
 Corthylus ustus Wood, 2007 c
 Corthylus venustus Wood & Bright, 1992 c
 Corthylus villifer Wood, 1974c c
 Corthylus villosus Eggers, 1943a c
 Corthylus villus Bright, 1972a c
 Corthylus vochysiae Wood, 2007 c
 Corthylus zelus Wood, 1974c c
 Corthylus zulmae Wood, 2007 c

Data sources: i = ITIS, c = Catalogue of Life, g = GBIF, b = Bugguide.net

References

Corthylus
Articles created by Qbugbot